Darryl Jones (born 1961) is an American bass guitarist.

Darryl Jones may also refer to:

Darryl Jones (baseball) (born 1951), American former Major League Baseball player
Darryl Jones (footballer), played in  2011–12 Ayr United F.C. season

See also
Daryl Jones (disambiguation)